Gurubari Meher was killed in fighting against a raja in India as part of the struggle to end British rule. Except for a small mention of her participation in the Praja Mandal Movement, very little is known about her. On 28 January 1947, a few months before India became independent, the then (princely) state government of Sonepur let loose a reign of terror at Binika. The people rose in revolt against the king for his pro-British stance. Nearly 20,000 freedom fighters, led by Gurubari Meher, organized a mass movement against the king. Police resorted to baton charge and subsequently the woman leader of the movement was shot dead by the police. A news item had been published in 'Dainik Asha' from Sambalpur with the headline 'Victory For the People Of Sonepur' which remains as the sole witness to her contribution.

References

1947 deaths
Indian independence activists from Odisha
Year of birth missing